Ipimorpha is a genus of moths of the family Noctuidae.

Species
 Ipimorpha contusa (Freyer, 1849)
 Ipimorpha guanyuana Chang, 1991
 Ipimorpha intexta Harvey, 1875
 Ipimorpha nanaimo Barnes, 1905
 Ipimorpha pleonectusa Grote, 1873 (syn: Ipimorpha subvexa Grote, 1876)
 Ipimorpha retusa (Linnaeus, 1761)
 Ipimorpha subtusa - The Olive (Denis & Schiffermüller, 1775)
 Ipimorpha viridipallida Barnes & McDunnough, 1916

References
Natural History Museum Lepidoptera genus database
Ipimorpha at funet

Caradrinini